Firewood is any wooden material that is gathered and used for fuel.  Generally, firewood is not heavily processed and is in some sort of recognizable log or branch form, compared to other forms of wood fuel like pellets. Firewood can be seasoned and heat treated (dry) or unseasoned (fresh/wet). It is generally classified as hardwood or softwood.

Firewood is a renewable resource. However, demand for this fuel can outpace its ability to regenerate on a local or regional level. Good forestry practices and improvements in devices that use firewood can improve local wood supplies.

Moving firewood long distances can potentially transport diseases and invasive species.

History

For most of human history firewood was the main fuel, until the use of coal spread during the Industrial Revolution. As such, access to firewood was a valued resource, wood botes or the right to gather firewood being a significant aspect of many medieval leases. As late as 19th C America, Thoreau considered that it was “remarkable what a value is still put upon wood even in this age and this country...the prince and the peasant, the scholar and the savage, equally require still a few sticks from the forest to warm them and cook their food”.

Harvesting
Harvesting or collecting firewood varies by the region and culture.  Some places have specific areas for firewood collection.  Other places may integrate the collection of firewood in the cycle of preparing a plot of land to grow food as part of a field rotation process. Collection can be a group, family or an individual activity.  The tools and methods for harvesting firewood are diverse.

North America
Some firewood is harvested in "woodlots" managed for that purpose, but in heavily wooded areas it is more usually harvested as a byproduct of natural forests. Deadfall that has not started to rot is preferred, since it is already partly seasoned. Standing dead timber is considered better still, for it has less humid organic material on the trunk, allowing tools to stay sharper longer, as well as being both seasoned and less rotten. Harvesting this form of timber reduces the speed and intensity of bushfires, but it also reduces habitat for snag-nesting animals such as owls, bats, and some rodents.

Harvesting timber for firewood is normally carried out by hand with chainsaws. Thus, longer pieces – requiring less manual labour, and less chainsaw fuel – are  less expensive and only limited by the size of the firebox. The heating value can affect the price. Prices also vary considerably with the distance from wood lots, and quality of the wood.

Buying and burning firewood that was cut only a short distance from its final destination prevents the accidental spread of invasive tree-killing insects and diseases.

Preparing
In most parts of the world, firewood is only prepared for transport at the time it is harvested. Then it is moved closer to the place where it will be used as fuel and prepared (split, seasoned, etc...) there. The process of making charcoal from firewood can take place at the place the firewood is harvested.

Most firewood also requires splitting, which also allows for faster seasoning by exposing more surface area. Today, most splitting is done with a hydraulic splitting machine, but it can also be split with a splitting maul or a wedge and sledge hammer. Some steel wedges have an angled blade so the mechanical advantage increases with depth. More unusual, and dangerous, is a tapered screw-style design, that augers into the wood, splitting it, and can be powered by either a power take-off drive, a dedicated internal combustion engine, or a rugged electric pipe-threading machine, which is safer than the other power sources because the power can be shut off more easily if necessary. Another method is to use a kinetic log splitter, which uses a rack and pinion system powered by a small motor and a large flywheel used for energy storage.

Storing
There are many ways to store firewood. These range from simple piles to free-standing stacks, to specialized structures.  Usually the goal of storing wood is to keep water away from it and to continue the drying process.

Stacks: The simplest stack is where logs are placed next to and on top of each other, forming a line the width of the logs. The height of the stack can vary, generally depending upon how the ends are constructed.  Without constructing ends, the length of the log and length of the pile help determine the height of a free-standing stack.

There is debate about whether wood will dry more quickly when covered. There is a trade-off between the surface of the wood getting wet vs. allowing as much wind and sun as possible to access the stack. A cover can be almost any material that sheds water – a large piece of plywood, sheet metal, terracotta tiles, or an oiled canvas cloth, even cheap plastic sheeting may also be used. Wood will not dry when completely enclosed. Ideally pallets or scrap wood should be used to raise the wood from the ground, reducing rot and increasing air flow.

There are many ways to create the ends of a stack. In some areas, a crib end is created by alternating pairs of logs to help stabilize the end.   A stake or pole placed in the ground is another way to end the pile.  A series of stacked logs at the end, each with a cord tied to it and the free end of the cord wrapped to log in the middle of the pile, is another way.

Under a roof:  Under a roof, there are no concerns about the wood being subjected to rain, snow or run-off, but ventilation needs to be provided if the wood is stored green so that moisture released from the wood does not recondense inside. The methods for stacking depend on the structure and layout desired.  Whether split, or in 'rounds' (flush-cut and unsplit segments of logs), the wood should be stacked lengthwise, which is the most stable and practical method. Again though, if the wood needs further seasoning there should be adequate air flow through the stack.

Storing outdoors: Firewood should be stacked with the bark facing upwards.  This allows the water to drain off, and standing frost, ice, or snow to be kept from the wood. Storing wood in close proximity to a dwelling increases the likelihood that insects such as termites can become established indoors.

Storing firewood indoors for any extended period of time is not recommended, for it increases the risk of introducing insects such as termites into the home.

Round stacks can be made many ways.  Some are piles of wood with a stacked circular wall around them. Others like the American Holz Hausen are more complicated. A Holz hausen, or "wood house", is a circular method of stacking wood; proponents say it speeds up drying on a relatively small footprint. A traditional holz hausen has a 10-foot diameter, stands 10 feet high, and holds about 6 cords of wood. The walls are made of pieces arranged radially, and tilted slightly inward for stability. The inside pieces are stacked on end to form a chimney for air flow. The top pieces are tilted slightly outward to shed rain and are placed bark side up.

Heating value 

The moisture content of firewood determines how it burns and how much heat is released.  Unseasoned (green) wood moisture content varies by the species; green wood may weigh 70 to 100 percent more than seasoned wood due to water content.  Typically, seasoned (dry) wood has 20% or less moisture content. Use of the lower heating value is advised as a reasonable standard way of reporting this data.

The energy content of a measure of wood depends on the tree species. The higher the moisture content, the more energy that must be used to evaporate (boil) the water in the wood before it will burn. Dry wood delivers more energy for heating than green wood of the same species.

The Sustainable Energy Development Office (SEDO), part of the Government of Western Australia states that the energy content of wood is 4.5 kWh/kg or 16.2 gigajoules/tonne (GJ/t).

Here are some examples of energy content of several species of wood:

Kiln (oven) dried firewood

To reduce the drying time to a number of days from the normal one to three years, an external heating source such as a kiln or oven can be used. The process of kiln or oven drying firewood was invented by Anthony Cutara, for which a successful US patent was filed in 1983. In 1987 the US Department of Agriculture replicated the method and published a detailed procedure for the production of kiln dried firewood, citing the higher heat output and increased combustion efficiency as a key benefit of the process.

Measurement

Usually firewood is sold by volume. While a specific volume term may be used, there can be a wide variation in what this means and what the measure can produce as a fuel. A measure of green unseasoned wood with 65% moisture contains less usable energy than when it has been dried to 20%. Regardless of the term, firewood measurement is best thought of as an estimate.

Traditional English
Early modern England measured firewood in terms of billets and bavins. A billet, like a bavin, was a piece of kindling wood. The 16th C standardised a billet as three foot four inches in length, and ten inches around (for open fires); and a bavin as three foot long and two feet round (a chunkier log, often used for ovens).

Metric
The most common firewood piece length are 33 cm and 50 cm. Wood can also be sold by the kilogram or by the tonne, as in Australia.

North America
In the United States and Canada, firewood is usually sold by the full cord, face cord or bag. A cord which is made from  logs will not be a cord when it has been cut into 1 foot logs and then split so each piece will fit through a  circle.

 The volume of a face cord or a rick depends on the length of the logs that are stacked in a  pile.

In popular culture
Jane Austen in 1814 complained to her sister that “My Mother’s Wood is brought in-but by some mistake, no Bavins. She must therefore buy some”. (Contemporary charges were between 6 and 15 shillings per hundred bavins).

In Norway, the non-fiction book Hel Ved (In English: Solid Wood: All About Chopping, Drying and Stacking Wood – and the Soul of Wood-Burning) by Lars Mytting became a bestseller in 2011–2012, selling 150,000 copies. A version of the book has also been published in Sweden, selling 50,000 copies.

In February 2013, the Norwegian state broadcast NRK sent a 12-hour live program on the topic of firewood , where a large part of the program consisted of showing firewood burning in a fireplace. More than one million people, 20% of Norway's population, saw part of the program.

See also
 
Biomass
Cordwood construction
Estovers
Multipurpose tree
Wood ash
 Wood fuel

References

External links

 Website which compares qualities of American wood species in cord measurements.
 A Graph showing Fuelwood & Firewood Production in Canada since 1940 

 
Fuels